FC Mertskhali is a Georgian association football club from Ozurgeti, currently playing in Regionuli Liga, the fifth tier of the national league system.

The club has spent four seasons in Umaglesi Liga, the top Georgian division.

History

Early period
Founded in 1936, the team finished 2nd in Division 2 in 1938 and advanced to the main league of the Soviet Georgian championship. 

In 1958 they claimed their first bronze medals. In the next two years Mertskhali twice clinched the Republican Cup. Also, in 1964 and 1966 the club again came the third, and in 1967 became a winner of the league, which paved the way for their participation in the Soviet championship. 

Mertskhali played there for seven seasons in a row and later, in 1980s, spent five more years in the third tier of the Soviet league system. Twice they came close to the promotion to the First League, including through a promotion play-off spot secured in 1985. 

The period between 1982 and 1987, when the team under long-time manager Bakhva Giorgadze secured five medals, is considered most remarkable in the club's history.

Since 1990
After Georgia restored its independence, the club played in Umaglesi Liga during the first three seasons after 1990 and also in 2003–04. Between 2007 and 2009 Mertskhali participated in the third tier, followed by nine successive seasons in Erovnuli Liga 2. Among them most noteworthy was the 2011/12 season when they finished 2nd and booked a place in promotion play-offs.

For the next three years the club was mainly in mid-table, although dismal performance in the 2015/16 season resulted in relegation to Meore Liga. Prior to the new season drastic changes were made, including appointment of well-known coach Khariton Chkhatarashvili as a manager.   He guided the team to the second place, but according to regulations introduced for this transitional season, only group winners could stay up. For this reason Mertskhali dropped down further to the fourth division, thus suffering two consecutive relegations within two years. It worsened the financial situation as well. The club was proposed for sale in early 2019, although unsuccessfully.  

Since 2017 Mertskhali have been a member of Regionuli Liga Group West.

Seasons

Honours
Georgian Soviet Championship
 Champion: 1967, 1982, 1987
 Bronze Medal winner: 1958, 1960, 1964, 1966
Georgian Soviet Cup
 Champion: 1959, 1960, 1982
Pirveli Liga
 Silver Medal winner: 1994, 2002–03, 2011–12
 Bronze Medal winner: 1997
Soviet Second League
 Silver Medal winner: 1984
 Bronze Medal winner: 1968, 1985

Notable players

National team member Irakli Zoidze started his professional career in this club in 1990.

Stadium 
Megobroba (literally - Friendship) football ground with the capacity of 10,000 seats was built in 1968, although later after the reconstruction it was reduced to 3,500.

Names 
1938-46 Makharadze* district team

1946-47 Dinamo

1947-54 Makharadze district team

1954-59 Kolmeurne

1960 Sikharuli

1961-93 Mertskhali

1993-95 Anako

Note: Makharadze was a Soviet-time name for Ozurgeti.

References

External Links
Profile on Soccerway

 
Mertskhali Ozurgeti
Ozurgeti
1936 establishments in Georgia (country)